CBTC mostly refers to Communications-based train control. It can also refer to: 

 Confederação Brasileira de Trabalhadores Cristãos, a trade union in Brazil
 CBTC-FM, a rebroadcaster of CBYG-FM